Medlock may refer to:

 Medlock (surname)
 River Medlock, a river of Greater Manchester
 19704 Medlock, an outer main-belt asteroid
 Chorlton-on-Medlock